

1929–30 season

Schedule and results

1930–31 season

Schedule and results

1931–32 season

Schedule and results

1932–33 season

Schedule and results

1933–34 season

Schedule and results

1934–35 season

Schedule and results

1935–36 season

Schedule and results

1936–37 season

Schedule and results

1937–38 season

Schedule and results

11-11 (5-7) SWC
Coach Jack Gray
Schedule ?

1938–39 season

References

1930